Alex is a 1993 Australian-New Zealand drama film directed by Megan Simpson and starring Lauren Jackson, Chris Haywood, and Josh Picker. It is based on a popular young adult novel by Tessa Duder. The film was never released theatrically in Australia, but shown in some foreign territories and went straight to video.

Premise
A young headstrong New Zealand woman's (Lauren Jackson) quest against the setbacks, intense rivalry and personal tragedy to win selection for the 1960 Rome Olympic Games in the women's 100m freestyle.

Cast 

 Lauren A Jackson as Alex Archer
 Chris Haywood as Mr Jack
 Josh Picker as Andy
 Cathy Godbold as Maggie Benton
 Elizabeth Hawthorne as Mrs Benton
 Bruce Phillips as Mr Archer
 May Lloyd as Mrs Archer
 Patrick Smith as Mr Benton
 Rima te Wiata as Female Commentator
 Mark Wright as Male Commentator
 Grant Tilly as Mr Upjohn
 Greg Johnson as Male Journo
 Alison Bruce as Female Journo

References
New Zealand Film 1912-1996 by Helen Martin & Sam Edwards p165 (1997, Oxford University Press, Auckland)

External links

Alex at NZ on Screen
Alex at NZ Videos
Alex at The New Zealand Film Archive (archived 2015)

Australian drama films
1992 films
New Zealand drama films
Films about the 1960 Summer Olympics
Films about Olympic swimming and diving
1990s English-language films